Columna  is a genus of air-breathing tropical land snails, terrestrial pulmonate gastropod mollusks in the family Achatinidae.

Species
Species within the genus Columna include:
 Columna columna (O.F. Müller, 1774)
 Columna flammea von Martens
 Columna hainesi (Pfeiffer, 1852)
 Columna leai Tryon, 1866

References
Zipcodezoo
Global Names
Achatinidae
Worldwide Mollusc Species Data Base

Achatinidae